Pistasus or Pistasos was a town of the Chalcidice in ancient Macedonia. It belonged to the Delian League since it appears in the tribute records of Athens for 434/3 BCE, where it had to pay a phoros of 500 drachmas. It has been suggested that Pistasus should be identified with another city that appears in another tribute register in Athens called Istasus, a suggestion accepted by the editors of the Barrington Atlas of the Greek and Roman World.

Its site is unlocated.

References

Populated places in ancient Macedonia
Former populated places in Greece
Geography of ancient Chalcidice
Members of the Delian League
Lost ancient cities and towns